Evergreen Cemetery is a historic rural cemetery located at Owego in Tioga County, New York.  It was established by the village of Owego in March 1851.  It is placed on a hill overlooking the village and Susquehanna River valley.  In 1920, a small, Gothic style memorial chapel was constructed.

It was listed on the National Register of Historic Places in 2002.

Notable burials
 John R. Drake (1782–1857) US Congressman
 John Mason Parker (1805–1873) US Congressman
 Thomas C. Platt (1833–1910) US Congressman and US Senator 
 George Adams Post (1854–1925) US Congressman
 Howard W. Robison (1915–1987) US Congressman.
 Richard Stout (1834–1896) Civil War Medal of Honor Recipient
 John J. Taylor (1808–1892) US Congressman

References

External links
 

Cemeteries on the National Register of Historic Places in New York (state)
Cemeteries in Tioga County, New York
National Register of Historic Places in Tioga County, New York
Rural cemeteries
Cemeteries established in the 1850s
1851 establishments in New York (state)